With 23 percent of the United States' population , the Catholic Church is the country's second largest religious grouping, after Protestantism, and the country's largest single church or Christian denomination where Protestantism is divided into separate denominations. In a 2020 Gallup poll, 25% of Americans said they were Catholic. The United States has the fourth largest Catholic population in the world, after Brazil, Mexico, and the Philippines.

Catholicism first arrived in North America during the Age of Discovery. In the colonial era, Spain and later Mexico established missions (1769-1833) that had permanent results in New Mexico and California (Spanish missions in California). Likewise, France founded settlements with missions attached to them in the Great Lakes and Mississippi River region, notably, Detroit (1701), St. Louis (1764) and New Orleans (1718). English Catholics, on the other hand, "harassed in England by the Protestant majority," settled in Maryland (1634) and founded the first state capitol, St. Mary's City, Maryland. In 1789, the Archdiocese of Baltimore was the first diocese in the newly independent nation. John Carroll became the first American bishop. His brother Daniel Carroll was the leading Catholic among the Founding Fathers of the United States. George Washington in the army and as president set a standard for religious toleration. No religious test was allowed for holding national office, and colonial legal restrictions on Catholics holding office were gradually abolished by the States. However, in the mid-19th century there was political anti-Catholicism in the United States, sponsored by pietistic Protestants fearful of the pope and rising Catholic immigration. Tensions between Protestants and Catholics continued in the 20th century, especially when a Catholic was running for president as in 1928 and 1960. 

The number of Catholics grew rapidly in the 19th and 20th centuries through high fertility and immigration, especially from Ireland and Germany, and after 1880, Eastern Europe, Italy, and Quebec. Large scale Catholic immigration from Mexico began after 1910, and in 2019 Latinos comprised 37 percent of American Catholics. Parishes set up parochial schools, and hundreds of colleges and universities were established by Catholic religious orders, notably by the Jesuits, who founded 28 such schools of higher education. Nuns were very active in teaching and hospital work. Since 1960, the percentage of Americans who are Catholic has fallen from about 25% to 22%. In a 2021 Pew Research study, "21% of US adults described themselves as Catholic, identical to the Catholic share of the population in 2014." In absolute numbers, Catholics have increased from 45 million to 72 million. , 39% of American Catholics attend church weekly, compared to 45% of American Protestants.

About 10% of the United States' population  are former Catholics or non-practicing, almost 30 million people. People have left for a number of reasons, factors which have also affected other denominations: loss of belief, disenchantment, indifference, or disaffiliation for another religious group or for none. Though Catholic adherents are present throughout the country, Catholics are generally more concentrated in the Northeast and urban Midwest. However, the continuing growth of the American Hispanic community as a share of the U.S. population is gradually shifting the geographic center of U.S. Catholicism from the Northeast and urban Midwest to the South and the West. Regional distribution of U.S. Catholics (as a percentage of the total U.S. Catholic population) is as follows: Northeast, 24%; Midwest, 19%; South, 32% (a percentage that has increased in recent years due to a growing number of Catholics mainly in Texas, Louisiana, and Florida, with the rest of the Southern states remaining overwhelmingly Protestant); and West, 25%. While the wealthiest and most educated Americans tend to belong to some Protestant American groupings as well as to Jewish and Hindu constituencies as a whole, more Catholics, owing to their sheer numbers, reside in households with a yearly income of $100,000-or-more than any other individual religious group, and more Catholics hold college degrees (over 19 million) than do members of any other faith community in the United States when divided according to their respective denominations or religious designations.

Organization

Catholics gather as local communities called parishes, headed by a priest, and typically meet at a permanent church building for liturgies every Sunday, weekdays and on holy days. Within the 196 geographical dioceses and archdioceses (excluding the Archdiocese for the Military Services), there were 17,007 local Catholic parishes in the United States in 2018. The Catholic Church has the third highest total number of local congregations in the US behind Southern Baptists and United Methodists. However, the average Catholic parish is significantly larger than the average Baptist or Methodist congregation; there are more than four times as many Catholics as Southern Baptists and more than eight times as many Catholics as United Methodists.

In the United States, there are 197 ecclesiastical jurisdictions:
 177 Western Catholic dioceses
 including 32 Latin Catholic archdioceses
 18 Eastern Catholic dioceses (eparchies)
 including 2 Eastern Catholic archdioceses (archeparchies)
 including 1 Eparchy (for the Syro-Malankara Catholic Church)
 2 personal ordinariates
 one for former Anglicans who came into full Catholic communion
 one for members of the military (though equivalent to an archdiocese, it is technically a military ordinariate)

Eastern Catholic Churches are churches with origins in Eastern Europe, Asia and Africa that have their own distinctive liturgical, legal and organizational systems and are identified by the national or ethnic character of their region of origin. Each is considered fully equal to the Latin tradition within the Catholic Church. In the United States, there are 15 Eastern Church dioceses (called eparchies) and two Eastern Church archdioceses (or archeparchies), the Byzantine Catholic Archeparchy of Pittsburgh and the Ukrainian Catholic Archeparchy of Philadelphia.

The apostolic exarchate for the Syro-Malankara Catholic Church in the United States is headed by a bishop who is a member of the U.S. Conference of Catholic Bishops. An apostolic exarchate is the Eastern Catholic Church equivalent of an apostolic vicariate. It is not a full-fledged diocese/eparchy, but is established by the Holy See for the pastoral care of Eastern Catholics in an area outside the territory of the Eastern Catholic Church to which they belong. It is headed by a bishop or a priest with the title of exarch.

The Personal Ordinariate of the Chair of Saint Peter was established January 1, 2012, to serve former Anglican groups and clergy in the United States who sought to become Catholic. Similar to a diocese though national in scope, the ordinariate is based in Houston, Texas, and includes parishes and communities across the United States that are fully Catholic, while retaining elements of their Anglican heritage and traditions.

, 8 dioceses out of 195 are vacant (sede vacante). None of the current bishops or archbishops are past the retirement age of 75.

The central leadership body of the Catholic Church in the United States is the U.S. Conference of Catholic Bishops, made up of the hierarchy of bishops (including archbishops) of the United States and the U.S. Virgin Islands, although each bishop is independent in his own diocese, answerable only to the Holy See. The USCCB elects a president to serve as their administrative head, but he is in no way the "head" of the church or of Catholics in the United States. In addition to the 195 dioceses and one exarchate represented in the USCCB, there are several dioceses in the nation's other four overseas dependencies. In the Commonwealth of Puerto Rico, the bishops in the six dioceses (one metropolitan archdiocese and five suffragan dioceses) form their own episcopal conference, the Puerto Rican Episcopal Conference (Conferencia Episcopal Puertorriqueña). The bishops in US insular areas in the Pacific Ocean—the Commonwealth of the Northern Mariana Islands, the Territory of American Samoa, and the Territory of Guam—are members of the Episcopal Conference of the Pacific.

No primate exists for Catholics in the United States. In the 1850s, the Archdiocese of Baltimore was acknowledged a Prerogative of Place, which confers to its archbishop some of the leadership responsibilities granted to primates in other countries. The Archdiocese of Baltimore was the first diocese established in the United States, in 1789, with John Carroll (1735–1815) as its first bishop. It was, for many years, the most influential diocese in the fledgling nation. Now, however, the United States has several large archdioceses and a number of cardinal-archbishops.

By far, most Catholics in the United States belong to the Latin or Western Church and the Roman Rite of the Catholic Church. Rite generally refers to the form of worship ("liturgical rite") in a church community owing to cultural and historical differences as well as differences in practice. However, the Vatican II document, Orientalium Ecclesiarum ("Of the Eastern Churches"), acknowledges that these Eastern Catholic communities are "true Churches" and not just rites within the Catholic Church. There are 14 other churches in the United States (23 within the global Catholic Church) which are in communion with Rome, fully recognized and valid in the eyes of the Catholic Church. They have their own bishops and eparchies. The largest of these communities in the U.S. is the Chaldean Catholic Church. Most of these churches are of Eastern European and Middle Eastern origin. Eastern Catholic Churches are distinguished from Eastern Orthodox, identifiable by their usage of the term Catholic.

In recent years, particularly following the issuing of the apostolic letter Summorum Pontificum by Pope Benedict XVI in 2007, the United States has emerged as a stronghold for the small but growing Traditionalist Catholic movement, along with France, England and a few other Anglophone countries. There are over 600 locations throughout the country where the Traditional Latin Mass is offered.

Personnel

The church employs people in a variety of leadership and service roles. Its ministers include ordained clergy (bishops, priests. and deacons) and non-ordained lay ecclesial ministers, theologians, and catechists.

Some Catholics, both lay and clergy, live in a form of consecrated life, rather than in marriage. This includes a wide range of relationships, from monastic (monks and nuns), to mendicant (friars and sisters), apostolic (priests, brothers, and sisters), and secular and lay institutes. While many of these also serve in some form of ministry, above, others are in secular careers, within or without the church. Consecrated life – in and of itself – does not make a person a part of the clergy or a minister of the church.

Additionally, many lay people are employed in "secular" careers in support of church institutions, including educators, health care professionals, finance and human resources experts, lawyers, and others.

Bishops

Leadership of the Catholic Church in the United States is provided by the bishops, individually for their own dioceses and collectively through the United States Conference of Catholic Bishops. There are some mid-level groupings of bishops, such as ecclesiastical provinces (often covering a state) and the fourteen geographic regions of the USCCB, but these have little significance for most purposes.

The ordinary office for a bishop is to be the bishop of a particular diocese, its chief pastor and minister, usually geographically defined and incorporating, on average, about 350,000 Catholic Christians. In canon law, the bishop leading a particular diocese, or similar office, is called an "ordinary" (i.e., he has complete jurisdiction in this territory or grouping of Christians).

There are two non-geographic dioceses, called "ordinariates", one for military personnel and one for former Anglicans who are in full communion with the Catholic Church.

Dioceses are grouped together geographically into provinces, usually within a state, part of a state, or multiple states together (see map below). A province comprises several dioceses which look to one ordinary bishop (usually of the most populous or historically influential diocese/city) for guidance and leadership. This lead bishop is their archbishop and his diocese is the archdiocese. The archbishop is called the "metropolitan" bishop who strives to achieve some unanimity of practice with his brother "suffragan" bishops.

Some larger dioceses have additional bishops assisting the diocesan bishop, and these are called "auxiliary" bishops or, if a "coadjutor" bishop, with right of succession.

Additionally, some bishops are called to advise and assist the bishop of Rome, the pope, in a particular way, either as an additional responsibility on top of their diocesan office or sometimes as a full-time position in the Roman Curia or related institution serving the universal church. These are called cardinals, because they are "incardinated" onto a second diocese (Rome). All cardinals under the age of 80 participate in the election of a new pope when the office of the papacy becomes vacant.

There are 428 active and retired Catholic bishops in the United States:

255 active bishops:
 36 archbishops
 144 diocesan bishops
 67 auxiliary bishops
 8 apostolic or diocesan administrators

173 retired bishops:
 33 retired archbishops
 95 retired diocesan bishops
 45 retired auxiliary bishops

Cardinals

There are 15 U.S. cardinals.

Six archdioceses are currently led by archbishops who have been created cardinals:
 Blase J. Cupich – Chicago
 Daniel DiNardo – Galveston-Houston
 Timothy M. Dolan – New York
 Seán Patrick O'Malley – Boston
 Joseph W. Tobin – Newark
 Wilton Daniel Gregory - Washington, D.C.

Three cardinals are in service to the pope, in the Roman Curia or related offices:
 Raymond Leo Burke – patron of the Sovereign Military Order of Malta
 Kevin Farrell – Prefect of the Dicastery for Laity, Family and Life
 James Michael Harvey – Archpriest of the Basilica of Saint Paul Outside the Walls

Six cardinals are retired:
 Roger Mahony – Archbishop Emeritus of Los Angeles
 Adam Maida – Archbishop Emeritus of Detroit
 Edwin Frederick O'Brien – Grand Master Emeritus of the Equestrian Order of the Knights of the Holy Sepulchre of Jerusalem
 Justin Francis Rigali – Archbishop Emeritus of Philadelphia
 James Stafford – Major Penitentiary Emeritus of the Apostolic Penitentiary and Archbishop Emeritus of Denver
 Donald Wuerl – Archbishop Emeritus of Washington, D.C.

Clergy and ministers

In 2018, there were approximately 100,000 clergy and ministers employed by the church in the United States, including:
 36,580 presbyters (priests)
 25,254 diocesan
 11,326 religious/consecrated
 18,291 ordinary (permanent) deacons
 39,651 lay ecclesial ministers (2016)
 23,149 diocesan
 16,502 religious/consecrated

There are also approximately 30,000 seminarians/students in formation for ministry:
 3,526 candidates for priesthood
 2,088 candidates for diaconate
 16,585 candidates for lay ecclesial ministry

Lay employees
The 630 Catholic hospitals in the U.S. have a combined budget of $101.7 billion, and employ 641,030 full-time equivalent staff.

The 6,525 Catholic primary and secondary schools in the U.S. employ 151,101 full-time equivalent staff, 97.2% of whom are lay and 2.3% are consecrated, and 0.5% are ordained.

The 261 Catholic institutions of higher (tertiary) education in the U.S. employ approximately 250,000 full-time equivalent staff, including faculty, administrators, and support staff.

Overall, the Catholic Church employs more than one million employees with an operating budget of nearly $100 billion to run parishes, diocesan primary and secondary schools, nursing homes, retreat centers, hospitals, and other charitable institutions.

Approved translations of the Bible

USCCB approved translations
Prior to 1991:

 Latin Vulgate 
 Douay-Rheims Bible (translated by Catholic scholars in exile from England with ecclesiastical authority from the Pope)
 Knox Bible (translated by English Monsignor Ronald A. Knox, version preferred by Fulton Sheen when quoting scripture)

1991–present:
 New American Bible, Revised Edition
 Books of the New Testament, Alba House
 Contemporary English Version – New Testament, First Edition, American Bible Society
 Contemporary English Version – Book of Psalms, American Bible Society
 Contemporary English Version – Book of Proverbs, American Bible Society
 The Grail Psalter (Inclusive Language Version), G.I.A. Publications
 New American Bible, Revised Old Testament
 New Revised Standard Version, Catholic Edition, National Council of Churches
 The Psalms, Alba House
 The Psalms (New International Version) – St. Joseph Catholic Edition, Catholic Book Publishing Company
 The Psalms – St. Joseph New Catholic Version, Catholic Book Publishing Company
 Revised Psalms of the New American Bible
 Revised Standard Version, Catholic Edition, National Council of Churches
 Revised Standard Version, Second Catholic Edition, National Council of Churches
 So You May Believe, A Translation of the Four Gospels, Alba House
 Today's English Version, Second Edition, American Bible Society
 Translation for Early Youth, A Translation of the New Testament for Children, Contemporary English Version, American Bible Society

Institutions

Parochial schools

By the middle of the 19th century, the Catholics in larger cities started building their own parochial school system. The main impetus was fear that exposure to Protestant teachers in the public schools, and Protestant fellow students, would lead to a loss of faith. Protestants reacted by strong opposition to any public funding of parochial schools. The Catholics nevertheless built their elementary schools, parish by parish, using very low-paid sisters as teachers.

In the classrooms, the highest priorities were piety, orthodoxy, and strict discipline. Knowledge of the subject matter was a minor concern, and in the late 19th century few of the teachers in parochial (or secular) schools had gone beyond the 8th grade themselves. The sisters came from numerous denominations, and there was no effort to provide joint teachers training programs. The bishops were indifferent. Finally around 1911, led by the Catholic University of America in Washington, Catholic colleges began summer institutes to train the sisters in pedagogical techniques. Long past World War II, the Catholic schools were noted for inferior plants compared to the public schools, and less well-trained teachers. The teachers were selected for religiosity, not teaching skills; the outcome was pious children and a reduced risk of marriage to Protestants. However, by the later half the 20th century Catholic schools began to perform significantly better than their public counterparts.

Universities and colleges

According to the Association of Catholic Colleges and Universities in 2011, there are approximately 230 Catholic universities and colleges in the United States with nearly 1 million students and some 65,000 professors. In 2016, the number of tertiary schools fell to 227, while the number of students also fell to 798,006. The national university of the church, founded by the nation's bishops in 1887, is The Catholic University of America in Washington, D.C. The first Catholic college/university of higher learning established in the United States is Georgetown University, founded in 1789. The richest U.S. Catholic university is the University of Notre Dame (founded in 1842) with an endowment of over 20 billion in 2022. In the 2021 edition of U.S. News & World Report rankings, 10 of the top 100 national universities in the US were Catholic.

Seminaries

According to the 2016 Official Catholic Directory,  there were 243 seminaries with 4,785 students in the United States; 3,629 diocesan seminarians and 1,456 religious seminarians. By the official 2017 statistics, there are 5,050 seminarians (3,694 diocesan and 1,356 religious) in the United States. In addition, the American Catholic bishops oversee the Pontifical North American College for American seminarians and priests studying at one of the Pontifical Universities in Rome.

Healthcare system
In 2002, Catholic health care system, overseeing 625 hospitals with a combined revenue of 30 billion dollars, was the nation's largest group of nonprofit systems. In 2008, the cost of running these hospitals had risen to $84.6 billion, including the $5.7 billion they donate. According to the Catholic Health Association of the United States, 60 health care systems, on average, admit one in six patients nationwide each year. According to Merger Watch (2018), Catholic facilities make up about 10% of all "sole community providers" in the US (49 out of 514). In some states, the percentage is much greater: in Wisconsin and South Dakota, for example, "Catholic hospitals account for at least 50% of sole community providers."

Catholic Charities
Catholic Charities is active as the largest voluntary social service networks in the United States. In 2009, it welcomed in New Jersey the 50,000th refugee to come to the United States from Burma. Likewise, the US Bishops' Migration and Refugee Services has resettled 14,846 refugees from Burma since 2006. In 2010 Catholic Charities USA was one of only four charities among the top 400 charitable organizations to witness an increase in donations in 2009, according to a survey conducted by The Chronicle of Philanthropy.

Catholic Church and labor

The church had a role in shaping the U.S. labor movement, due to the involvement of priests like Charles Owen Rice and John P. Boland. The activism of Geno Baroni was instrumental in creating the Catholic Campaign for Human Development. The Catholic Worker Movement was founded in 1933 by Dorothy Day and Peter Maurin. It campaigns on various social justice issues and aims to "live in accordance with the justice and charity of Jesus Christ".

Prisons

Demographics

There were 70,412,021 registered Catholics in the United States (22% of the US population) in 2017, according to the American bishops' count in their Official Catholic Directory 2016. This count primarily rests on the parish assessment tax which priests evaluate yearly according to the number of registered members and contributors. In July, 2021, the Public Religion Research Institute issued its own report based on a new census of 500,000 people. It also noted that 22% of 330 million Americans identified as Catholic: 12%, white; 8%, Latino; and 2%, other (Black, Asian, etc.). Estimates of the overall American Catholic population from recent years generally range around 20% to 28%. According to Albert J. Menedez, research director of "Americans for Religious Liberty," many Americans continue to call themselves Catholic but "do not register at local parishes for a variety of reasons." According to a survey of 35,556 American residents (released in 2008 by the Pew Forum on Religion and Public Life), 23.9% of Americans identify themselves as Catholic (approximately 72 million of a national population of 306 million residents). The study notes that 10% of those people who identify themselves as Protestant in the interview are former Catholics and 8% of those who identity themselves as Catholic are former Protestants. In recent years, more parishes have opened than closed.

The northeastern quadrant of the US (i.e., New England, Mid-Atlantic, East North Central, and West North Central) has seen a decline in the number of parishes since 1970, but parish numbers are up in the other five regions (i.e., South Atlantic, East South Central, West South Central, Pacific, and Mountain regions) and are growing steadily. Catholics in the US are about 6% of the church's total worldwide 1.3 billion membership.

A poll by The Barna Group in 2004 found Catholic ethnicity to be 60% non-Hispanic white (includes Americans with historically Catholic ethnicities such as Irish, Italian, German, Polish, or French), 31% Hispanic of any nationality (mostly Mexicans but also many Cubans, Puerto Ricans, Dominicans, Salvadorans, Colombians, Guatemalans and Hondurans among others), 4% Black (including Africans, Haitians, black Latino and Caribbean), and 5% other ethnicity (mostly Filipinos, Vietnamese and other Asian Americans, Americans who are multiracial and have mixed ethnicities, and American Indians). Among the non-Hispanic whites, about 16 million Catholics identify as being of Irish descent, about 13 million as German, about 12 million as Italian, about 7 million as Polish, and about 5 million as French (note that many identify with more than one ethnicity). The roughly 7.8 million Catholics who are converts (mainly from Protestantism, with a smaller number from irreligion or other religions) are also mostly non-Hispanic white, including many people of British, Dutch, and Scandinavian ancestry.

Between 1990 and 2008, there were 11 million additional Catholics. The growth in the Latino population accounted for 9 million of these. They accounted for 32% of all American Catholics in 2008 as opposed to 20% in 1990. The percentage of Hispanics who identified as Catholic dropped from 67% in 2010 to 55% in 2013.

According to a more recent Pew Forum report which examined American religiosity in 2014 and compared it to 2007, there were 50.9 million adult Catholics  (excluding children under 18), forming about 20.8% of the U.S. population, down from 54.3 million and 23.9% in 2007. Pew also found that the Catholic population is aging, forming a higher percentage of the elderly population than the young, and retention rates are also worse among the young. About 41% of those "young" raised Catholic have left the faith (as opposed to 32% overall), about half of these to the unaffiliated population and the rest to evangelical, other Protestant faith communities, and non-Christian faith. Conversions to Catholicism are rare, with 89% of current Catholics being raised in the religion; 8% of current Catholics are ex-Protestants, 2% were raised unaffiliated, and 1% in other religions (Orthodox Christian, Mormon or other nontrinitarian, Buddhist, Muslim, etc.), with Jews and Hindus least likely to become Catholic of all the religious groups surveyed. Overall, Catholicism has by far the worst net conversion balance of any major religious group, with a high conversion rate out of the faith and a low rate into it; by contrast, most other religions have in- and out-conversion rates that roughly balance, whether high or low. This is credited to the more liberal stance of the church since Vatican II, where conversion to Catholicism is no longer encouraged, and the de-emphasizing of basic Catholic religious beliefs in Catholic education. Still, according to the 2015 Pew Research Center, "the Catholic share of the population has been relatively stable over the long term, according to a variety of other surveys. By race, 59% of Catholics are non-Hispanic white, 34% Hispanic, 3% black, 3% Asian, and 2% mixed or Native American. Conversely, 19% of non-Hispanic whites were Catholic in 2014 (down from 22% in 2007), whereas 55% of Hispanics were (versus 58% in 2007). In 2015, Hispanics were 38%, while blacks and Asians were at 3% each. Because conversion away from Catholicism as well as dropping out of religion completely is presently occurring much more quickly among Hispanics than among Euro-American whites, Black (2.9% of US Catholic population) and Asian-American Catholics, it is doubtful they will outnumber the latter three categories of Catholics in the foreseeable future. Pew Research Center predicts that by 2050 (when the Hispanic population will be 128 million), only 40% of "third generation Latinos" will be Catholic, with 22% becoming Protestant, 24% becoming unaffiliated, and the remainder, other. This corresponds to a sharp decline in the Catholic percentage among self-identified Democrats, who are more likely to be nonwhite than Republicans. In one study, three authors found that around 10% of US Catholics are "Secularists," "meaning that their religious identification is purely nominal."

By state

Within the United States, it "represents
perhaps the most multi-ethnic organization of any kind, and so is a major laboratory for cross-cultural cooperation and
cross-cultural communication completely within the nation's borders."

Politics

There has never been a Catholic religious party in the United States, either local, state or national, similar to Christian democratic parties in Europe. The American Solidarity Party, however, is a minor third party with ideas based on Catholic social teaching.

Historically, a majority of the Catholics in the United States supported the Democratic Party before 1968. Since the election of the Catholic John F. Kennedy as President in 1960, Catholics have split about 50-50 between the two major parties, but the Democrats have a slight lead due to the growing population of Hispanic Americans.

On social issues, the Catholic Church takes strong positions against abortion, which was partly legalized in 1973 by the Supreme Court until it was overturned in 2022 with the Dobbs v. Jackson Women's Health Organization case, and same-sex marriage, which was fully legalized in June 2015. The church also condemns embryo-destroying research and In vitro fertilization as immoral. The church is allied with conservative evangelicals and other Protestants on these issues.

However, the Catholic Church throughout its history has taken special concern for numerous vulnerable groups. This has led to progressive alliances, as well, with the church championing causes such as a strong welfare state, unionization, immigration for those fleeing economic or political hardship, opposition to capital punishment, environmental stewardship, opposition and critical evaluation of modern warfare.

The Catholic Church's teachings, coming from the perspective of a global church, do not conform easily to the American political binary of "liberals" and "conservatives." A majority of Catholics who favor abortion rights support the Democrats, while most anti-abortion Catholics support the Republicans.  In August 2012 the New York Times, reviewed the religion of the nine top national leaders: the presidential and vice-presidential nominees, the Supreme Court justices, the House Speaker, and the Senate majority leader. There were nine Catholics (six justices, both vice-presidential candidates, and the Speaker), three Jews (all from the Supreme Court), two Mormons (including the Republican presidential nominee Mitt Romney) and one African-American Protestant (incumbent President Barack Obama). There were no white Protestants. 
In 2021, 30.9% of Congress was Catholic and 24.5% of the Senate was of the faith.

Social issues
The Catholic Church's involvement in social or political movements was not very prominent until bishops in the United States addressed problems on racism in 1958 in a written piece called "Discrimination and Christian Conscience". In the 1960s, the Catholic Church showed support in the Selma to Montgomery marches, which involved the attendance of Dutch priest Henri Nouwen.

History

Early colonial period

One of the colonies of British America, the Province of Maryland, "a Catholic Proprietary," was founded with an explicitly English Catholic identity in the 17th century, contrasting itself with the neighbouring Protestant-dominated Massachusetts Bay Colony and Colony of Virginia. It was named after the Catholic Queen Henrietta Maria, the wife of Charles I of England. Politically, it was under the influence of Catholic colonial families of Maryland such as the Calvert Baron Baltimore and the Carroll family, the latter of Irish origin. Much of the religious situation in the Thirteen Colonies reflected the sectarian divisions of the English Civil War and in a larger sense the aftermath of the English Reformation. Furthermore, radical Puritans, who were viewed as outsiders in England for their opposition to the establishment Laudian-leaning Anglican Church, saw settlement in the American Colonies, particularly with the Plymouth Colony, as a way to escape religious restrictions against them in "the motherland" and were often theologically even more hostile to Catholics than the situation in England itself. The Province of Pennsylvania, which was given to the Quaker, William Penn by the last Catholic King of England, James II, advocated religious toleration as a principle and thus some Catholics lived there. There were also some Catholics in the Province of New York (named after the aforementioned James II). In 1785, the estimated number of Catholics was at 25,000; 15,800 in Maryland, 7,000 in Pennsylvania and 1,500 in New York. There were only 25 priests serving the faithful. This was less than 2% of the total population in the Thirteen Colonies.

Following the United States Declaration of Independence in 1776, the United States came to incorporate into itself territories with a pre-existing Catholic history under their previous governance by New France and New Spain; the two premier European Catholic powers active in North America. The territorial evolution of the United States since 1776 has meant that today more areas that are now part of the United States were Catholic in colonial times before they were Protestant. In 1803, the Louisiana Purchase saw vast territories in French Louisiana transferred over from the Catholic Kingdom of France, areas that would become the following states; Arkansas, Iowa, Missouri, Kansas, Oklahoma, Nebraska, Minnesota, Louisiana, South Dakota, Wyoming and Montana, half of Colorado and North Dakota, parts of New Mexico, Texas and North Dakota. The French named a number of their settlements after Catholic saints, such as St. Louis, Sault Ste. Marie, St. Ignace, St. Charles and others. The Catholic, culturally French population of Americans, descended from this colony are today known as the Louisiana Creole and Cajun people.

During the 19th century, territories previously belonging to the Catholic Spanish Empire became part of the United States, starting with Florida in the 1820s. Most of the Spanish American territories with a Catholic heritage became independent during the early 19th century, this included Mexico on the border of the United States. The United States subsequently annexed parts of Mexico, starting with Texas in the 1840s and after the end of the Mexican–American War an area known as the Mexican Cession, including what would become the states of California, Nevada, Utah, most of Arizona, the rest of New Mexico, Colorado and Wyoming. To an even greater extent than the French, the Spanish had named many settlements in the colonial period after Catholic saints or in reference to Catholic religious symbolism, names that they would retain after becoming part of the United States, especially in California (Los Angeles, San Francisco, San Diego, Sacramento, San Bernardino, Santa Barbara, Santa Monica, Santa Clarita, San Juan Capistrano, San Luis Obispo and numerous others), as well as Texas (San Antonio, San Juan, San Marcos and San Angelo), New Mexico (Santa Fe) and Florida (St. Augustine). As late as 1898, following the Spanish–American War, the United States took control of Puerto Rico, Guam and the Philippines, as well as Cuba for a time, all of which had several centuries of Spanish Catholic colonial history (though they were not made into states).

Towards the founding of the United States

Anti-Catholicism was official government policy for the English who settled the colonies along the Atlantic seaboard. Maryland was founded by a Catholic, Lord Baltimore, as the first 'non-denominational' colony and was the first to accommodate Catholics. A charter was issued to him in 1632. In 1650, the Puritans in the colony rebelled and repealed the Act of Toleration. Catholicism was outlawed and Catholic priests were hunted and exiled. By 1658, the Act of Toleration was reinstated and Maryland became the center of Catholicism into the mid-19th century. In 1689 Puritans rebelled and again repealed the Maryland Toleration Act. These rebels cooperated with the colonial assembly "dominated by Anglicans to endow the Church of England with tax support and to bar Catholics (and Quakers) from holding public office." New York, interestingly enough, proved more tolerant with its Catholic governor, Thomas Dongan, and other Catholic officials.  Freedom of religion returned with the American Revolution. In 1756, a Maryland Catholic official estimated seven thousand practicing Catholics in Maryland and three thousand in Pennsylvania. The Williamsburg Foundation estimates in 1765 Maryland Catholics at 20,000 and 6,000 in Pennsylvania. The population of these colonies at the time was approximately 180,000 and 200,000, respectively.  By the time the American War for Independence started in 1776, Catholics formed 1.6%, or 40,000 persons of the 2.5 million population of the 13 colonies. Another estimate is 35,000 in 1789, 60% in Maryland with not many more than 30 priests. John Carroll, first Catholic Bishop, in 1785, two years after the Treaty of Paris (1783), reported 24,000 registered communicants in the new country, of whom 90% were in Maryland and Pennsylvania.

After the Revolution, Rome made entirely new arrangements for the creation of an American diocese under American bishops. Numerous Catholics served in the American army and the new nation had very close ties with Catholic France. General George Washington insisted on toleration; for example, he issued strict orders in 1775 that "Pope's Day," the colonial equivalent of Guy Fawkes Night, was not to be celebrated. European Catholics played major military roles, especially Gilbert du Motier, Marquis de Lafayette, Jean-Baptiste Donatien de Vimeur, comte de Rochambeau, Charles Hector, comte d'Estaing, Casimir Pulaski and Tadeusz Kościuszko. Irish-born Commodore John Barry from Co Wexford, Ireland, often credited as "the Father of the American Navy," also played an important military role. In a letter to Bishop Carroll, Washington acknowledged this unique contribution of French Catholics as well as the patriotic contribution of Carroll himself: "And I promise that your fellow-citizens will not forget the patriotic part which you took in the accomplishments of their Revolution, and the establishment of their government; nor the important assistance which they received from a nation in which the Roman Catholic religion is professed."

Beginning in approximately 1780 there was a struggle between lay trustees and bishops over the ownership of church property, with the trustees losing control following the 1852 Plenary Councils of Baltimore.

Of the colonial era, historian Jay Dolan says:
They had lived as second-class citizens, discriminated against politically, professionally, and socially. The revolution changed all this. New laws and new constitutions gave them religious freedom.... [leading] John Carroll to observe in 1779 that Roman Catholics are members of Congress, assemblies, and hold civil and military posts.President Washington promoted religious tolerance by proclamations and by publicly attending services in various Protestant and Catholic churches.  The old colonial laws imposing restrictions on Catholics were gradually abolished by the states, and were prohibited in the new federal constitution.

In 1787 two Catholics, Daniel Carroll of the Irish O'Carrolls and Irish born Thomas Fitzsimons, helped draft the new United States Constitution. John Carroll was appointed by the Vatican as Prefect Apostolic, making him superior of the missionary church in the thirteen states. He formulated the first plans for Georgetown University and became the first American bishop in 1789.

19th century (1800–1900)

The number of Catholics surged starting in the 1840s as German, Irish, and other European Catholics came in large numbers. After 1890, Italians and Poles formed the largest numbers of new Catholics, but many countries in Europe contributed, as did Quebec. By 1850, Catholics had become the country's largest single denomination. Between 1860 and 1890, their population tripled to seven million.

Some anti-Catholic political movements appeared: the Know Nothings in the 1840s. American Protective Association in the 1890s, and the second Ku Klux Klan in the 1920s, were active in the United States. But even as early as 1884, in the face of outbreaks of anti-Catholicism, Catholic leaders like James Cardinal Gibbons were filled with admiration for their country: "The oftener I go to Europe," Gibbons said, "the longer I remain there, and the more I study the political condition of its people, I return home filled with greater admiration for our own country and [am] more profoundly grateful that I am an American citizen." Animosity by Protestants waned as Catholics demonstrated their patriotism in World War I, their commitment to charity, and their dedication to democratic values.

The bishops began standardizing discipline in the American Church with the convocation of the Plenary Councils of Baltimore in 1852, 1866 and 1884. These councils resulted in the promulgation of the Baltimore Catechism and the establishment of The Catholic University of America.

Jesuit priests who had been expelled from Europe found a new base in the U.S. They founded numerous secondary schools and 28 colleges and universities, such as Georgetown University (1789), St. Louis University (1818), Boston College,  the College of Holy Cross, the University of Santa Clara, and several Loyola Colleges. Many other religious communities like the Dominicans, Congregation of Holy Cross, and Franciscans followed suit.

In the 1890s the Americanism controversy roiled senior officials. The Vatican suspected there was too much liberalism in the American Church, and the result was a turn to conservative theology as the Irish bishops increasingly demonstrated their total loyalty to the Pope, and traces of liberal thought in the Catholic colleges were suppressed. As part of this controversy, the founder of the Paulist Fathers, Isaac Hecker, was accused by the French cleric Charles Maignen (article in French) of subjectivism and crypto-Protestantism. Additionally some who sympathized with Hecker in France were accused of Americanism.

Nuns and sisters
 Nuns and sisters played a major role in American religion, education, nursing and social work since the early 19th century. In Catholic Europe, convents were heavily endowed over the centuries, and were sponsored by the aristocracy. But there were very few rich American Catholics, and no aristocrats. Religious orders were founded by entrepreneurial women who saw a need and an opportunity, and were staffed by devout women from poor families. The numbers grew rapidly, from 900 sisters in 15 communities in 1840, 50,000 in 170 congregations in 1900, and 135,000 in 300 different congregations by 1930. Starting in 1820, the sisters always outnumbered the priests and brothers. Their numbers peaked in 1965 at 180,000 then plunged to 56,000 in 2010. Many women left their orders, and few new members were added.

On April 8, 2008, Cardinal William Levada, prefect of the Congregation for the Doctrine of the Faith under Pope Benedict XVI, met with the Leadership Conference of Women Religious leaders in Rome and communicated that the CDF would conduct a doctrinal assessment of the LCWR, expressing concern that the nuns were expressing radical feminist views. According to Laurie Goodstein, the investigation, which was viewed by many U.S. Catholics as a "vexing and unjust inquisition of the sisters who ran the church's schools, hospitals and charities", was ultimately closed in 2015 by Pope Francis.

20th–21st centuries

In the era of intense emigration from the 1840s to 1914, bishops often set up separate parishes for major ethnic groups, from Ireland, Germany, Poland, French Canada and Italy. In Iowa, the development of the Archdiocese of Dubuque, the work of Bishop Loras and the building of St. Raphael's Cathedral, to meet the needs of Germans and Irish, is illustrative. Noteworthy, too, was the contribution of 400 Italian Jesuit expatriates who, between 1848-1919, planted dozens of institutions to serve the diverse population out West. By century's end, they had founded colleges (later to become universities) in San Francisco, Santa Clara, Denver, Seattle and Spokane to meet the cultural and religious needs of people of that region. They also ministered to miners in Colorado, to Native Peoples in several states, and to Hispanics in New Mexico, "building churches [in the latter state], publishing books and newspapers, and running schools in both the public and private sectors." 
 
By the beginning of the 20th century, approximately one-sixth of the population of the United States was Catholic. Modern Catholic immigrants come to the United States from the Philippines, Poland and Latin America, especially Mexico and Central America. This multiculturalism and diversity has influenced the conduct of Catholicism in the United States. For example, most dioceses offer Mass in a number of languages, and an increasing number of parishes offer Masses in the official language of the church, Latin, due to its universal nature.

Sociologist Andrew Greeley, an ordained Catholic priest at the University of Chicago, undertook a series of national surveys of Catholics in the late 20th century.  He published hundreds of books and articles, both technical and popular.  His biographer summarizes his interpretation:
He argued for the continued salience of ethnicity in American life and the distinctiveness of the Catholic religious imagination. Catholics differed from other Americans, he explained in a variety of publications, by their tendency to think in "sacramental" terms, imagining God as present in a world that was revelatory rather than bleak. The poetic elements in the Catholic tradition—its stories, imagery, and rituals—kept most Catholics in the fold, according to Greeley, whatever their disagreements with particular aspects of church discipline or doctrine. Despite the unchanging nature of church doctrine, Greeley insisted that Humanae Vitae, the 1968 papal encyclical upholding the Catholic ban on contraception is solely responsible for the sharp decline in weekly Mass attendance between 1968 and 1975.

In 1965, 71% of Catholics attended Mass regularly.

In the later 20th century "[...] the Catholic Church in the United States became the subject of controversy due to allegations of clerical child abuse of children and adolescents, of episcopal negligence in arresting these crimes, and of numerous civil suits that cost Catholic dioceses hundreds of millions of dollars in damages." Because of this, higher scrutiny and governance as well as protective policies and diocesan investigation into seminaries have been enacted to correct these former abuses of power, and safeguard parishioners and the church from further abuses and scandals.

One initiative is the "National Leadership Roundtable on Church Management" (NLRCM), a lay-led group born in the wake of the sexual abuse scandal and dedicated to bringing better administrative practices to 194 dioceses that include 19,000 parishes nationwide with some 35,000 lay ecclesial ministers who log 20 hours or more a week in these parishes.

According to a 2015 study by Pew Researchers, 39% of Catholics attend church at least once a week and 40%, once or twice a month.

Although the issue of trusteeism was mostly settled in the 19th century, there have been some related issues. In 2005, an interdict was issued to board members of St. Stanislaus Kostka Church (St. Louis, Missouri) in an attempt to get them to turn over the church property to the Archdiocese of St. Louis. In 2006, a priest was accused of stealing $1.4 million from his parish, prompting a debate over Connecticut Raised Bill 1098 as a means of forcing the Catholic church to manage money differently. Related to issues of asset ownership, some parishes have been liquidated and the assets taken by the diocese instead of being distributed to nearby parishes, which in violation of church financial rules.

In 2009 John Micklethwait, editor of The Economist and co-author of God Is Back: How the Global Revival of Faith Is Changing the World, said that American Catholicism, which he describes in his book as "arguably the most striking Evangelical success story of the second half of the nineteenth century," has competed quite happily "without losing any of its basic characteristics." It has thrived in America's "pluralism."

In 2011, an estimated 26 million American Catholics were "fallen-away", that is, not practicing their faith. Some religious commentators commonly refer to them as "the second largest religious denomination in the United States." Recent Pew Research survey results in 2014 show about 31.7% of American adults were raised Catholic, while 41% from among that group no longer identify as Catholic.

In a 2015 survey by researchers at Georgetown University, Americans who self identify as Catholic, including those who do not attend Mass regularly, numbered 81.6 million or 25% of the population, and 68.1 million or 20% of the American population are Catholics tied to a specific parish. About 25% of US Catholics say they attend Masses once a week or more, and about 38% went at least once a month. The study found that the number of US Catholics has increased by 3 to 6% each decade since 1965, and that the Catholic Church is "the most diverse in terms of race and ethnicity in the US," with Hispanics accounting for 38% of Catholics and blacks and Asians 3% each. The Catholic Church in the US represents perhaps "the most multi-ethnic organization of any kind, and so is a major laboratory for cross-cultural cooperation and cross-cultural communication completely within the nation's borders." It is as if it wishes to forge a broader ecclesial identity to give newcomers a more inclusive welcome, similar to the aspirations of 19th century church leaders like Archbishops John Ireland and James Gibbons who "wanted Catholic immigrants to become fully American, rather than 'strangers in a strange land.' " Only 2 percent of American Catholics go to confession on a regular basis, while three-quarters of them go to confession once a year or less often; a valid confession is required by the Church after committing mortal sin in order to return to the State of Grace, necessary to receive Holy Communion. As one of the precepts of the church, it is also required that every Catholic makes a valid confession at least once a year.

According to Matthew Bunsen’s analysis of a Real
Clear poll of American Catholics in late 2019:
Catholicism has been battered by the winds of secularism, materialism, and relativism. Failures in catechesis and formation have created wide gaps in practice and belief that stretch now into every aspect of Catholic life.

Since 1970, weekly church attendance among Catholics has dropped from 55% to 20%, the number of priests declined from 59,000 to 35,000 and the number of people who have left Catholicism has increased from under 2 million in 1975 to over 30 million today.  In 2022, there were fewer than 42,000 nuns left in the United States, a 76% decline over 50 years, with fewer than 1% of nuns under age 40.

The RealClear poll data indicates that the Latino element has now reached 37 percent of the Catholic population, and growing. It is 60 percent Democratic, while the non-Latinos are split about 50-50 politically. Although many Americans still identify as Catholics, their religious participation rates are declining.  Today only 39% of all Catholics go to Mass at least weekly.  Nearly two-thirds of Catholics say that their trust in the church leadership has been undermined by the clergy sex abuse crisis.  Nevertheless, 86% of all Catholics still consider religion important in their own lives.

Some notable American Catholics

Entertainment
 Stephen Colbert - Television host
 Jimmy Fallon - Television host
 Lady Gaga - Singer
 Mel Gibson - Actor
 Madonna - Singer, songwriter, dancer, actress
 Grace Kelly - Actress & Princess of Monaco
 Jimmy Kimmel - Television host
 Conan O'Brien - Television host
 Frank Sinatra - Singer & Actor
 Arnold Schwarzenegger- Actor
 Martin Sheen - Actor, activist
 Mark Wahlberg- Actor 
 John Wayne - Actor

Politics
 Amy Coney Barrett - Associate Justice of the Supreme Court
 Joe Biden - 46th President of the United States
 Charles Carroll of Carrollton - Founding Father of the U.S.
 Daniel Carroll - Founding Father of the U.S.
 Alexander Haig - 59th Secretary of State
 Brett Kavanaugh - Associate Justice of the Supreme Court
 Jacqueline Kennedy Onassis - First Lady of the United States
 John F. Kennedy - 35th President of the United States
 Ted Kennedy - U.S. Senator, brother of President Kennedy and Robert "Bobby" Kennedy
 Robert F. Kennedy - U.S. Attorney General, presidential candidate - 1968
 Edmund Muskie - 58th Secretary of State
 John Roberts - 17th Chief Justice of the United States 
 Clarence Thomas - Associate Justice of the Supreme Court
 Roger B. Taney - 5th Chief Justice of the United States 
 Melania Trump - First Lady of the United States
 Edward Douglass White - 9th Chief Justice of the United States

Other
 Kobe Bryant - Professional basketball player
 John Carroll - Archbishop of Baltimore
 Toni Morrison - Novelist

Servants of God and those declared venerable, beatified, and canonized saints

The following are some notable Americans declared as Servants of God, venerables, beatified, and canonized saints:

Servants of God

Thea Bowman
Simon Bruté
Vincent Robert Capodanno
Walter Ciszek
Terence Cooke
Dorothy Day
Black Elk
Demetrius Gallitzin
Julia Greeley
John Hardon
Isaac Hecker
Emil Kapaun
Eusebio Francisco Kino
Mary Elizabeth Lange
Rose Hawthorne Lathrop
James Miller
Joseph Muzquiz
Frank Parater
Félix Varela
Paul Wattson
Annella Zervas

Venerables

Nelson Baker
Frederic Baraga
Cornelia Connelly
Henriette DeLille
Samuel Charles Mazzuchelli
Patrick Peyton
Aloysius Schwartz
Fulton J. Sheen
Augustus Tolton
Pierre Toussaint

Beatified
Solanus Casey
Teresa Demjanovich
Michael J. McGivney
James Alfred Miller, FSC
Carlos Manuel Rodriguez
Stanley Rother
Francis Xavier Seelos

Saints

Frances Xavier Cabrini
Marianne Cope
Jean de Lalande
Damien De Veuster
Katharine Drexel
Rose Philippine Duchesne
René Goupil
Mother Théodore Guérin
Isaac Jogues
John Neumann
Junípero Serra
Elizabeth Ann Seton
Kateri Tekakwitha

Top pilgrimage destinations in the United States
 National Shrine of The Divine Mercy (Stockbridge, Massachusetts)
 National Shrine of Our Lady of Czestochowa (Doylestown, Pennsylvania)
 Shrine of Our Lady of Guadalupe (La Crosse, Wisconsin)
 National Shrine of St. Francis of Assisi (San Francisco, California)
 Saint Anthony's Chapel (Pittsburgh), Pennsylvania
 National Blue Army Shrine of the Immaculate Heart of Mary (Washington Township, Warren County, New Jersey)
 National Shrine of the North American Martyrs (Auriesville, New York)
 Basilica of the National Shrine of the Assumption of the Blessed Virgin Mary (Baltimore, Maryland)
 El Santuario de Chimayo (Chimayo, New Mexico; north of Santa Fe)
 Basilica of the National Shrine of St. Elizabeth Ann Seton (Emmitsburg, Maryland)
 Shrine of the Most Blessed Sacrament of Our Lady of the Angels (Hanceville, Alabama)
 Basilica of Our Lady of Victory (Lackawanna, New York)
 National Shrine of Saint John Neumann (in St. Peter the Apostle Church, Philadelphia, Pennsylvania)
 Basilica of the National Shrine of the Immaculate Conception (Washington, D.C.)

See also

 History of the Catholic Church in the United States
 Catholic Home Missions
 Catholic Church by country
 Catholic Church and politics in the United States
 List of Catholic dioceses in the United States
 List of American Catholic priests
 List of Catholic authors (Lists include American Catholics [Western/Latin Rite and Eastern Catholic])
 List of converts to the Catholic Church 
 List of Catholic scientists
 List of Catholic clergy scientists
 List of Catholic musicians
 America Needs Fatima
 Christianity in the United States
 Holy See–United States relations
 Eastern Catholic Churches

References

Further reading
 Abell, Aaron. American Catholicism and Social Action: A Search for Social Justice, 1865–1950 (Garden City, NY: Hanover House, 1960).
 Bales, Susan Ridgley. When I Was a Child: Children's Interpretations of First Communion (Chapel Hill: University of North Carolina, 2005).
 Carroll, Michael P. American Catholics in the Protestant Imagination: Rethinking the Academic Study of Religion (Baltimore, Md.: Johns Hopkins University Press, 2007).
 Coburn, Carol K. and Martha Smith. Spirited Lives: How Nuns Shaped Catholic Culture and American Life, 1836–1920 (1999) pp 129–58  excerpt and text search
 Curan, Robert Emmett. Shaping American Catholicism: Maryland and New York, 1805–1915. Washington, DC: Catholic University of America, 2012.
 D'Antonio, William V., James D. Davidson, Dean R. Hoge, and Katherine Meyer. American Catholics: Gender, Generation, and Commitment (Huntington, Ind.: Our Sunday Visitor Visitor Publishing Press, 2001).
 Deck, Allan Figueroa, S.J. The Second Wave: Hispanic Ministry and the Evangelization of Cultures (New York: Paulist, 1989).
 Dolan, Jay P. The Immigrant Church: New York Irish and German Catholics, 1815–1865 (Baltimore: Johns Hopkins University Press, 1975).
 Dolan, Jay P. In Search of an American Catholicism: A History of Religion and Culture in Tension (2003)
 Donovan, Grace. "Immigrant Nuns: Their Participation in the Process of Americanization," in Catholic Historical Review 77, 1991, 194–208.
 Ellis, J.T. American Catholicism 2nd ed.(Chicago: University of Chicago Press, 1969).
 Ellis, J.T. The Life of James Cardinal Gibbons (Milwaukee: The Bruce Publishing Company, 1963)
 Finke, Roger. "An Orderly Return to Tradition: Explaining Membership Growth in Catholic Religious Orders," in Journal for the Scientific Study of Religion , 36, 1997, 218–30.
 Fogarty, Gerald P., S.J. Commonwealth Catholicism: A History of the Catholic Church in Virginia, .
 Garcia, Angel. The Kingdom Began In Puerto Rico: Neil Connolly's Priesthood In The South Bronx (New York: Fordham University Press, 2020).
 Garraghan, Gilbert J. The Jesuits of the Middle United States Vol. II (Chicago: Loyola University Press, 1984).
 Greeley, Andrew. "The Demography of American Catholics, 1965–1990" in The Sociology of Andrew Greeley (Atlanta: Scholars Press, 1994).
 Hall, Gwendolyn Midlo. The Development of Afro-Creole Culture in the Eighteenth Century (Baton Rouge: Louisiana State University Press, 1995).
 Horgan, Paul. Lamy of Santa Fe (Toronto: McGraw-Hill, 1975).
 Jonas, Thomas J. The Divided Mind: American Catholic Evangelists in the 1890s (New York: Garland Press, 1988).
 Marty, Martin E. Modern American Religion, Vol. 1: The Irony of It All, 1893–1919 (1986); Modern American Religion. Vol. 2: The Noise of Conflict, 1919–1941 (1991); Modern American Religion, Volume 3: Under God, Indivisible, 1941–1960 (1999).
 McDermott, Scott. Charles Carroll of Carrollton—Faithful Revolutionary .
 McGuinness Margaret M. Called to Serve: A History of Nuns in America (New York University Press, 2013) 266 pages;  excerpt and text search
 McGuinness Margaret M. and James T. Fisher (eds.) Roman Catholicism in the United States: A Thematic History. (New York: Fordham University Press, 2019).
 McKevitt, Gerald. Brokers of Culture: Italian Jesuits in the American West, 1848–1919 (Stanford: Stanford University Press, 2006).
 McMullen, Joanne Halleran and Jon Parrish Peede, eds. Inside the Church of Flannery O'Connor: Sacrament, Sacramental, and the Sacred in Her Fiction (Macon, GA: Mercer University Press, 2007).
 Maynard, Theodore The Story of American Catholicism, Volumes I and II (New York: Macmillan Company, 1960).
 Morris, Charles R. American Catholic: The Saints and Sinners Who Built America's Most Powerful Church (1998), a popular history
 O'Toole, James M.  The Faithful: A History of Catholics in America (2008)
 Poyo, Gerald E. Cuban Catholics in the United States, 1960–1980: Exile and Integration (Notre Dame: Notre Dame University Press, 2007).
 Sanders, James W. The Education of an urban Minority: Catholics in Chicago, 1833–1965 (New York: Oxford University Press, 1977).
 Schroth, Raymond A. The American Jesuits: A History (New York: New York University Press, 2007).
 Schultze, George E. Strangers in a Foreign Land: The Organizing of Catholic Latinos in the United States (Lanham, Md:Lexington, 2007).
 Stepsis, Ursula and Dolores Liptak. Pioneer Healers: The History of Women Religious in American Health Care (1989) 375pp
 Walch, Timothy. Parish School: American Catholic Parochial Education from Colonial Times to the Present (New York: Crossroad Publishing, 1996).
 Weber, David J. The Spanish Frontier in North America (New Haven, CT: Yale University Press, 1992).

Historiography
 Dries, Angelyn. "'Perils of Ocean and Wilderness[: A Field Guide to North American Catholic History." Catholic Historical Review 102.2 (2016) pp 251–83.
 Gleason, Philip. "The Historiography of American Catholicism as Reflected in The Catholic Historical Review, 1915–2015." Catholic Historical Review 101#2 (2015) pp: 156–222. online
 Thomas, J. Douglas. "A Century of American Catholic History." US Catholic Historian (1987): 25–49. in JSTOR

Primary sources
 Ellis, John Tracy. Documents of American Catholic History 2nd ed. (Milwaukee: Bruce Publishing Co., 1956).

External links
 United States Conference of Catholic Bishops
 Global Catholic Statistics: 1905 and Today by Albert J. Fritsch, SJ, PhD
 The percentage of Catholics in the U.S. (1890–2010)
 Largest religious groups in the United States

 
United States